Marlon Brando (1924 – 2004) was an American actor and considered one of the most influential actors of the 20th century. Having studied with Stella Adler in the 1940s, he is credited with being one of the first actors to bring the Stanislavski system of acting, and method acting, to mainstream audiences. He gained acclaim for his role of Stanley Kowalski in the 1951 film adaptation of Tennessee Williams' play A Streetcar Named Desire, a role that he originated successfully on Broadway. He received further praise, and a first Academy Award and Golden Globe Award, for his performance as Terry Malloy in On the Waterfront, and his portrayal of the rebellious motorcycle gang leader Johnny Strabler in The Wild One proved to be a lasting image in popular culture. Brando received Academy Award nominations for playing Emiliano Zapata in Viva Zapata! (1952); Mark Antony in Joseph L. Mankiewicz's 1953 film adaptation of Shakespeare's Julius Caesar; and Air Force Major Lloyd Gruver in Sayonara (1957), an adaptation of James A. Michener's 1954 novel.

The 1960s saw Brando's career take a commercial and critical downturn. He directed and starred in the cult western One-Eyed Jacks, a critical and commercial flop, after which he delivered a series of notable box-office failures, beginning with Mutiny on the Bounty (1962). After ten years of underachieving, he agreed to do a screen test as Vito Corleone in Francis Ford Coppola's The Godfather (1972). The Godfather became the highest-grossing film ever made, and alongside his Oscar-nominated performance in Last Tango in Paris (1972), Brando reestablished himself in the ranks of top box-office stars. After a hiatus in the early 1970s, Brando appeared in supporting roles such as Jor-El in Superman (1978), as Colonel Kurtz in Apocalypse Now (1979), and Adam Steiffel in The Formula (1980), before taking a nine-year break from film.

Stage

Film

Television

Music video

Video game

References

Filmography
Male actor filmographies
American filmographies